Motility is the ability of an organism to move independently, using metabolic energy.

Definitions

Motility, the ability of an organism to move independently, using metabolic energy, can be contrasted with sessility, the state of organisms that do not possess a means of self-locomotion and are normally immobile. 
Motility differs from mobility, the ability of an object to be moved.
The term vagility encompasses both motility and mobility; sessile organisms including plants and fungi often have vagile parts such as fruits, seeds, or spores which may be dispersed by other agents such as wind, water, or other organisms.

Motility is genetically determined, but may be affected by environmental factors such as toxins. The nervous system and musculoskeletal system provide the majority of mammalian motility.

In addition to animal locomotion, most animals are motile, though some are vagile, described as having passive locomotion. Many bacteria and other microorganisms, and multicellular organisms are motile; some mechanisms of fluid flow in multicellular organs and tissue are also considered instances of motility, as with gastrointestinal motility. Motile marine animals are commonly called free-swimming, and motile non-parasitic organisms are called free-living.

Motility includes an organism's ability to move food through its digestive tract. There are two types of intestinal motility – peristalsis and segmentation. This motility is brought about by the contraction of smooth muscles in the gastrointestinal tract which mix the luminal contents with various secretions (segmentation) and move contents through the digestive tract from the mouth to the anus (peristalsis).

Cellular level 

At the cellular level, different modes of movement exist:

 amoeboid movement, a crawling-like movement, which also makes swimming possible
 filopodia, enabling movement of the axonal growth cone
 flagellar motility, a swimming-like motion (observed for example in spermatozoa, propelled by the regular beat of their flagellum, or the E. coli bacterium, which swims by rotating a helical prokaryotic flagellum)
 gliding motility
 swarming motility
 twitching motility, a form of motility used by bacteria to crawl over surfaces using grappling hook-like filaments called type IV pili.

Many cells are not motile, for example Klebsiella pneumoniae and Shigella, or under specific circumstances such as Yersinia pestis at 37 °C.

Movements

Events perceived as movements can be directed:
 along a chemical gradient (see chemotaxis)
 along a temperature gradient (see thermotaxis)
 along a light gradient (see phototaxis)
 along a magnetic field line (see magnetotaxis)
 along an electric field (see galvanotaxis)
 along the direction of the gravitational force (see gravitaxis)
 along a rigidity gradient (see durotaxis)
 along a gradient of cell adhesion sites (see haptotaxis)
 along other cells or biopolymers

See also
 Cell migration

References

Physiology
Cell movement
Articles containing video clips